Kyaw Ni is a politician who currently serves as Deputy Minister of Labour Affairs of NUG.

He was appointed by the Committee Representing Pyidaungsu Hluttaw as the Deputy Minister of Labour Affairs in the National Unity Government of Myanmar on 3 May 2021.

References

Living people
Burmese politicians
1978 births